The ornate flycatcher (Myiotriccus ornatus) is a species of bird in the family Tyrannidae. It is the only member of the genus Myiotriccus. It is found in Colombia, Ecuador, and Peru.

The ornate flycatcher is a fairly small flycatcher at an average length of 12 cm (4.7 in) and weighing about 13.5 grams (0.5 oz). It is very distinctive in the field due to its bright yellow belly, white post-ocular spots, dusky head and conspicuous large yellow rump against dusky wings. In Ecuador, the mantle and tail are rusty colored in East Slope birds and earth brown in West Slope birds. The ornate flycatcher's natural habitat is subtropical or tropical moist montane forests.

References

ornate flycatcher
Birds of the Northern Andes
ornate flycatcher
Taxonomy articles created by Polbot